The adductor muscles of the hip are a group of muscles mostly used for bringing the thighs together (called adduction).

Structure
The adductor group is made up of:
Adductor brevis 
Adductor longus
Adductor magnus 
Adductor minimus This is often considered to be a part of adductor magnus.
pectineus
gracilis 
Obturator externus and are also part of the medial compartment of thigh

The adductors originate on the pubis and ischium bones and insert mainly on the medial posterior surface of the femur.

Nerve supply
The pectineus is the only adductor muscle that is innervated by the femoral nerve.

Variation
In 33% of people a supernumerary muscle is found between the adductor brevis and adductor minimus. When present, this muscle originates from the upper part of the inferior ramus of the pubis from where it runs downwards and laterally. In half of cases, it inserts into the anterior surface of the insertion aponeurosis of the adductor minimus. In the remaining cases, it is either inserted into the upper part of the pectineal line or the posterior part of the lesser trochanter. While similar to its neighbouring adductors, it is formed by separation from the superficial layer of the obturator externus, and is thus not ontogenetically related to the adductors.

Clinical significance

Tenotomy
So-called adductor tenotomy (cutting the origin tendons of the adductor muscles of the thigh) and obturator neurectomy (cutting the anterior branch of the obturator nerve) are sometimes performed on children with cerebral palsy. These children often have hypertonia of the adductor muscles, making abduction difficult, obstructing normal hip development, and putting them at risk of hip luxation.

References

 

 
Thigh muscles
Medial compartment of thigh

it:Muscoli adduttori dell'anca